A lampshade is a fixture that envelops the lightbulb on a lamp to diffuse the light it emits. Lampshades can be made out of a large variety of materials like paper, glass, fabric or stone. Often times conical or cylindrical in shape, lampshades can be found on floor, desk, tabletop, or suspended lamps.  The term can also apply to the glass (or other materials) hung around many designs of ceiling lamp.  Beyond its practical purpose, significant emphasis is also usually given to decorative and aesthetic features. A lamp shade also serves to "shade" human eyes from the direct glare of the light bulbs used to illuminate the lamp. Some lamp shades are also lined with a hard-backed opaque lining, often white or gold, to reflect as much light as possible through the top and bottom of the shade while blocking light from emitting through the walls of the shade itself. In other cases, the shade material is deliberately decorative so that upon illumination it may emphasize a display of color and light emitting through the shade surface itself.

History

In the late 17th-century in Paris the first public lanterns made their appearance in the centre of the streets. They lit the road during the night. In 1763, the réverbères made their appearance. These were oil lamps with reflectors that were hung above the center of streets. The first public oil lamps in Milan, financed by revenues from a lottery, date from 1785. These were lanterns containing an oil lamp with a number of wicks. A semi-spherical reflector above the flame projected the light downwards, while another reflector, slightly concave and near the flame, served to direct the light laterally.

Friedrich Albert Winsor initially had the idea of industrializing lighting by producing gas in a factory and distributing it through a pipeline. In the first decades of the 19th century, competing gas companies laid the first gas mains in major cities. But there were fears of explosion and toxicity.

The flame fed by the gas coming out of the nozzle was intense, uniform and adjustable, white and brilliant instead of the reddish or orange of oil lamps or candles.

The drawbacks of gas lighting were overheating of the air and extremely high oxygen consumption, making it necessary to ventilate the room or isolate the flame by separating the room where the combustion took place from the room being lit. Theatre audiences regularly suffered from headaches and the sulphur and ammonia formed during combustion of the gas ruined furniture.

Gas light had to be filtered by opal glass or light fabric shades. Lampshades were no longer used to direct the light but to attenuate it.

In 1879, Joseph Swan and Thomas Edison independently developed—combining and perfecting existing elements deriving from the research of Humphry Davy, De Moleyn and Göbel—the incandescent filament electric light bulb.

To disguise the intense electric light, lampshades were used. Some were made by Tiffany in colored glass. The great advantage of the electric light bulb was the absence of flame and traces of combustion, thus avoiding all risks of intoxication, explosion or fire. In the beginning, the filament was made of carbonised vegetable fibres, then bamboo fibres and finally metal alloys until, in the early 20th century, the tungsten filament invented in 1904 became established.

Lampshade types
Modern lampshades can be classified by shape, by material, by fitter, or by function.

Shades by shape
Lampshades are classified in four basic shapes:  drum, empire, bell or coolie depending on their shape. A drum or cylinder shade typically features vertical sides, sometimes with a very slight incline where the top of the shade is slightly smaller than the bottom. A slightly greater incline produces a "floor" shade which is not far from the "true" drum profile. As the slope of the side of the shade increases, the design moves through the classic empire shade (or variation with straight or bell-curved sides) on towards the more pyramidal-style shape of a coolie shade.

Beyond the basics, lampshade shapes also include square, cut-corner, hexagon, gallery, oval, or scalloped shapes. Square, rectangular and oval shades appear to have these shapes when viewed from above or below. This also includes hexagonal shades and cut-corner shades which appear like square or round shades with the "corners cut off" or indented. A shade with a gallery can be of any shape but has a distinct strip around the bottom of the shade.

Some of the lampshades are as follows:

 Rustic: simple elements like linen, cork, and cotton in muted earth tones complement rustic farmhouse or cottage interiors
 Traditional: often linen, paper shades, and silk shades inside pleated and box pleated shapes
 Modern: innovative shapes like drum, square, and cylinder
 Antique & Vintage Inspired: antique reproduction lamp shades demonstrate even past era, often in textures like glass, fringe, and beaded that are not generally found in current designs

Lampshades by material
Lampshades are made of fabric, parchment, glass, Tiffany glass, paper or plastic. Common fabric materials include silk, linen and cotton. Fabric shades are reinforced by metal frames to give the lampshades their shape, while paper or plastic shades can hold their shape without support. For this reason, paper shades can be more fragile than fabric shades. Darker shades sometimes add a reflective liner such as gold or silver in order to maximize light output.

Lampshade fitters
A "fitter" describes how the lampshade connects to the lamp base. The most common lampshade fitter is a Spider fitter. Spider fitters are set on top of a lamp harp, and secured with a finial. The harp is typically seated below the socket and two arms rise up around the light bulb and join at the top, where it provides resting support for the spider fitter itself. The fitter is built into the lamp shade frame itself and sits on top of the harp. Other fitters include clip-on (for either regular bulbs or candelabra bulbs), Uno fitters which are attached to the lamp itself below the light bulb, and notched-bowl fitters which support the use of a glass reflector bowl.

Consideration of light bulb heat
A lamp shade's surfaces have varying proximity to the light bulb or light source itself, depending on the size and shape of the shade. With larger shades this is less of a problem, since the shade provides an ample funnel for the movement of air up through the shade, whereby heat from the bulb leaves the top of the shade through the opening. However, with smaller shades consideration has to be given to proximity of the shade surface to the bulb, especially in miniature shades used on chandeliers. Here, and especially with shades which have sloped sides, the distance between the surface and the bulb reduces making the risk of overheating a concern. The heat generated by incandescent light bulbs can scorch fabric lampshades and can crack glass shades. All of these problems can be avoided by the simple expedient of installing LED lights.  These save energy, last longer and emit very little heat.

References

External links 
 
 

Light fixtures